Thomas W. Mossberg (born 1951) is an American physicist, formerly of Columbia, Harvard, and the University of Oregon. He was also the founding President and CEO at LightSmyth Technologies, a nanotechnology company in Eugene, Oregon.

Early life and education 
The son of William and Rosemary (née Kotilinek) Mossberg, Thomas William Mossberg was born in 1951 in Hennepin, Minnesota. He completed his undergraduate work at the University of Chicago in 1973. He earned a Ph.D. at Columbia University 1978, with a dissertation titled, Excited-state, tri-level, and two-photon echoes in atomic sodium vapor, advised by Sven R. Hartmann.

Career 
After faculty positions at Columbia University and Harvard University, Mossberg joined the physics faculty at the University of Oregon from 1986–1999. Colleague Michael Raymer wrote, "Thomas Mossberg (Ph.D. Columbia Univ., 1978) in 1987 established a group to study experimental quantum optics. His group was first to demonstrate narrowing below the natural line width of an atomic emission line by the modification of the density of optical states within an optical cavity. In 1999 Mossberg went on to found successful optical technology companies in the Eugene area."

In 1996, the American Physical Society reported on "recent advances in spectral holographic optical data storage" of Mossberg's research, leading to "high capacity, high speed, optical RAM, and content-controlled optical switching devices". Mossberg's research between 1995–1997 was supported by NSF grants valued at $492,530.

At the urging of the University Technology Transfer Office, Mossberg started Templex Technology, Inc.:

Mossberg's research produced hardware with record-breaking information density and speed:

Mossberg also founded LightSmyth Technologies, serving as its president and CEO from 2000 until his retirement in 2018. The firm had three NASA research awards between 2005–2007, at a total value of $769,744.  LightSmyth Technologies produced high performance transmission gratings and other diffractive devices for the optical communications industry.  In 2014, LightSmyth Technologies was acquired by Finisar Corporation which was in turn acquired by II-VI Corporation.

Selected publications

Selected patents 
.
.
.

Awards, honors 

 Mossberg was elected an Optical Society of America Fellow in 1993.
 In 1995, Mossberg was elected a Fellow of the American Physical Society, cited For his work on optical resonance and cavity quantum electrodynamics, including the imaginative use of dressed-atom effects to control atomic dynamics and create new mechanisms for optical gain.

References 

1951 births
American inventors
American physicists
Columbia University alumni
Columbia University faculty
Harvard University faculty
University of Chicago alumni
University of Oregon faculty
Living people
Fellows of the American Physical Society